Brigadier Harold Willmott  (18991993) was a South African military commander.

Military career 

He served in the Royal Air Force in World War I, and joined the South African Air Force in 1924.

During World War II, he served as Deputy Director-General of Air Services from 1939 to 1940, as commander of 3 Wing in North Africa from 1941 to 1942, as Director of the Coastal Air Force from 1942 to 1944, and as Deputy Director-General of the Air Force from 1944 to 1945, when he was promoted to Director-General.

After the war, he served as Officer Commanding Natal Command, and finally as Air Chief of Staff, from 17 October 1945 to 10 September 1946.

Honours and awards

He was appointed Commander of the Most Excellent Order of the British Empire in the January 1943 New Year Honours list.

See also

List of South African military chiefs
South African Air Force

References

1899 births
1993 deaths
South African people of British descent
White South African people
South African Air Force personnel
Chiefs of the South African Air Force
South African Air Force personnel of World War II
South African Commanders of the Order of the British Empire
Graduates of the Staff College, Camberley